Vazha Margvelashvili (Georgian: ვაჟა მარგველაშვილი; born 3 October 1993) is a Georgian judoka. He won gold medal at the 2016 European Judo Championships and silver medal at the 2020 Summer Olympics in the men's 66 kg event.

In 2021, he won one of the bronze medals in his event at the 2021 Judo World Masters held in Doha, Qatar. A few months later, he won the silver medal in the men's 66 kg event at the 2021 European Judo Championships held in Lisbon, Portugal.

He won one of the bronze medals in his event at the 2022 Judo Grand Slam Paris held in Paris, France.

References

External links
 
 
 
 

1993 births
Male judoka from Georgia (country)
Living people
Judoka at the 2020 Summer Olympics
Judoka at the 2016 Summer Olympics
Olympic judoka of Georgia (country)
Judoka at the 2019 European Games
European Games medalists in judo
European Games bronze medalists for Georgia (country)
Olympic silver medalists for Georgia (country)
Medalists at the 2020 Summer Olympics
Olympic medalists in judo
21st-century people from Georgia (country)